Carry On may refer to:

Carry On (franchise), a British comedy media franchise
Carry-on luggage or hand luggage, luggage that is carried into the passenger compartment
Carry On (film), a 1927 British silent film
Carry On (novel), a 2015 fantasy novel by Rainbow Rowell
Carry On (Supernatural), the series finale of the television series Supernatural

Music

Albums
Carry On (Chris Cornell album)
Carry On (Crosby, Stills, Nash & Young album), a sampler of the box set CSN, 1991
Carry On (Kansas album), 1992
Carry On (Pat Green album)
Carry On (Stephen Stills album), a box set, 2013
Carry On (EP), a 2011 EP by People on Vacation
Carry On, see Bobby Caldwell
Carry On (The Score album), a 2020 album by The Score

Songs
"Carry On" (Avenged Sevenfold song), 2012
"Carry On" (Crosby, Stills, Nash & Young song), 1970
"Carry On" (Donna Summer song), 1992
"Carry On" (Fun song), 2012
"Carry On" (Kygo and Rita Ora song), 2019
"Carry On" (Lisa Stansfield song), 2014
"Carry On" (Martha Wash song), 1992
"Carry On" (Motor Ace song), 2002
"Carry On" (Norah Jones song), 2016
"Carry On" (Pat Green song), 2001
"Carry On", by Angra from Angels Cry
"Carry On", by Bayside from The Walking Wounded
"Carry On", by The Box
"Carry On", by Coeur de Pirate
"Carry On", by Coldrain from The Revelation
"Carry On", by The Cranberries from Wake Up and Smell the Coffee
"Carry On", by England Dan & John Ford Coley from I Hear Music
"Carry On", by Freedom Call from The Circle of Life
"Carry On", by Jennifer Cihi from the final season one episode of Sailor Moon
"Carry On", by JJ Cale from Shades
"Carry On", by Manowar from Fighting the World
"Carry On", by Martha Wash, also covered by Diana Ross from Every Day Is a New Day
"Carry On", by Memphis May Fire from This Light I Hold
"Carry On", by Mushroomhead from A Wonderful Life
"Carry On", by Night Ranger from Big Life
"Carry On", by Olivia Holt from the film Bears
"Carry On", by Soul Asylum from While You Were Out
"Carry On", by Spacehog from The Chinese Album
"Carry On", by Uriah Heep from Conquest
"Carry On", by XXXTentacion from 17
"Carry On (Her Letter to Him)", a song by Ne-Yo from R.E.D.
"Carry On, a song by American pop-rock duo The Score, featuring indie pop band AWOLNATION, from   Carry On , 2020

See also
Keep Calm and Carry On, a 1939 British wartime poster that has become a cultural meme
"Carry On Wayward Son", a 1976 song by Kansas
 Carreon (disambiguation)
 Carrion (disambiguation)